Here Comes Mr. Oh (lit. "Here Comes Oh Ja-ryong" or "Oh Ja-ryong is Coming") is a 2012 South Korean television series starring Lee Jang-woo, Oh Yeon-seo, Jin Tae-hyun, and Seo Hyun-jin. The daily drama aired on MBC on Mondays to Fridays at 19:15 from November 19, 2012 to May 17, 2013 for 129 episodes.

Plot
The drama juxtaposes two very different men who married two sisters. Oh Ja-ryong is a gregarious and good-natured fellow with a pure heart who is honestly devoted to his wife Gong-joo, while Jin Yong-seok married his wife Jin-joo because of her family's fortune and is now plotting to steal their estate. The jobless Ja-ryong stands up to his greedy and conniving brother-in-law Yong-seok, and saves his in-laws from ruin.

Cast

Main characters
Lee Jang-woo as Oh Ja-ryong 
Oh Yeon-seo as Na Gong-joo 
Jin Tae-hyun as Jin Yong-seok 
Seo Hyun-jin as Na Jin-joo

Supporting characters

Na family
Chang Mi-hee as Jang Baek-ro 
Dokgo Young-jae as Na Sang-ho

Oh family
Kim Hye-ok as Go Sung-sil 
Kim Young-ok as Chun Geum-soon 
Han Jin-hee as Oh Man-soo 
Ryu Dam as Oh Jae-ryong

Lee family
Lee Hwi-hyang as Lee Ki-ja 
Jo Mi-ryung as Lee Ki-young

Extended cast
Jung Chan as Kang In-gook 
Yoo Ho-rin as Kim Ma-ri 
Kim Min-soo as Jang Min-woo 
Jang Joon-yoo as Se-ra 
Kim Choo-wol as Soo-yeon 
Jung Da-hye as Mi-rim 
Lee Re as Byul, In-gook's daughter
Park Hyun-sook as homeless director
Park Seon-hee as Gamjatang vice manager
Kil Yong-woo as Wang Chul-soo
Choi Min as Kang Sung-shik
Kim Jung-do as Kwang-soo
Choi Hyun-seo as Yoo-mi
Lee Jin-saem
Yoo Soo-in

Awards
2012 MBC Drama Awards
Excellence Award, Actress in a Serial Drama: Seo Hyun-jin.
Best New Actor: Lee Jang-woo.
Best New Actress: Oh Yeon-seo.

2013 Korea Drama Awards 
Excellence Award, Actress: Seo Hyun-jin.

2013 APAN Star Awards
Popular Star Award, Actress: Oh Yeon-seo.

2013 Korean Culture and Entertainment Awards
Excellence Award, Actor in Drama: Lee Jang-woo.

References

External links
Here Comes Mr. Oh official MBC website 

MBC TV television dramas
2012 South Korean television series debuts
2013 South Korean television series endings
Korean-language television shows
South Korean romance television series